"Die Bouzouki, die Nacht und der Wein" is a song by Greek singer Demis Roussos from his 1976 German-language album Die Nacht und der Wein. It was also released as a single (in early 1976 on Philips Records).

Background and writing 
The song was written by Ralf Arnie and Leo Leandros. The recording was produced by Leo Leandros.

Commercial performance 
The song spent seven weeks in the German chart, peaking at no. 43.

Track listing 
7" single Philips 6042 110 (February 1976, Germany)
 A. "Die Bouzouki, die Nacht und der Wein" (3:41)
 B. "Wenn ich wiederkomm'" (3:51)

Charts

References

External links 
 Demis Roussos — "Die Bouzouki, die Nacht und der Wein" at Discogs

1976 songs
1976 singles
Demis Roussos songs
Philips Records singles
Songs written by Leo Leandros
Song recordings produced by Leo Leandros